HMS Belfast is a Type 26 frigate of the Royal Navy and the second vessel named after the Northern Ireland capital Belfast. In September 2017, her name was announced by the First Sea Lord. HM ships' names are selected by the Ships' Names and Badges Committee. HMS Belfast (C35) was renamed to HMS Belfast (1938) by the Imperial War Museum to avoid confusion. She was ordered on 2 July 2017. The first steel was cut on HMS Belfast 29 June 2021 by HRH The Duke of Cambridge.

References

 

Proposed ships of the Royal Navy
Type 26 frigates